Archibald Charles Wilder (April 30, 1917 – December 24, 2002) was a Canadian professional ice hockey left winger who played 18 games in the National Hockey League (NHL) with the Detroit Red Wings during the 1940–41 season, registering two assists and two penalty minutes. The rest of his career, which lasted from 1935 to 1952, was spent in various minor leagues. Wilder was born in Melville, Saskatchewan.

Career statistics

Regular season and playoffs

External links

1917 births
2002 deaths
Calgary Stampeders (ice hockey) players
Canadian ice hockey left wingers
Detroit Red Wings players
Ice hockey people from Saskatchewan
Indianapolis Capitals players
Omaha Knights (AHA) players
Saskatoon Quakers players
Sportspeople from Melville, Saskatchewan